Warwick HRI (formerly Horticulture Research International) was a United Kingdom organisation tasked with carrying out horticultural research and development and transferring the results to industry in England.

History
Horticulture Research International (HRI) was constituted in May 1990 from the Agricultural and Food Research Council Institute of Horticultural Research Stations at Wellesbourne (the National Vegetable Research Station), East Malling (the East Malling Research Station) and Littlehampton (the Glasshouse Crops Research Institute), the Hop Unit at Wye College and the ADAS Experimental Stations of the Ministry of Agriculture, Fisheries and Food at Efford, Kirton and Stockbridge.

Warwick HRI was formed on 1 April 2004 following the integration of HRI's sites at Wellesbourne and Kirton with the University of Warwick. The Kirton site was closed by the university in February 2009.

In November 2009, Warwick University announced that it had decided to close Warwick HRI as the centre was losing the university £2 million a year. Warwick HRI was merged with the University's Department of Biological Sciences into a new School of Life Sciences in October 2010. Some research work on vegetable genetic improvement continued at the Crop Centre.

Research
The Wellesbourne site covered an area of 191 hectares and contained protected crop facilities, state-of-the-art glasshouses, a Bioconversion Unit, controlled environment units and first-class laboratory facilities including the Genomic Resource Centre. The Kirton site spanned 50 hectares, with modern seed handling equipment and a 4-hectare organic area.

Research at Warwick HRI fell within four main areas: plant science, crop and environmental sciences, applied microbial sciences and applied horticultural research. The department was home to internationally recognised research scientists and was at the forefront of teaching in these areas with a number of taught MSc courses and also research degrees leading to MSc, MPhil or PhD.

Warwick HRI was a member of the European Plant Science Organisation (EPSO).

See also
Botany
Phytopathology
Plant physiology
Evolutionary history of plants
Sustainable Agriculture

For details of the closure, see 'What's Going on at Wellesbourne?'.

References

External links
The University of Warwick - Warwick HRI
The European Plant Science Organisation
Warwick HRI to close
History of Warwick HRI / NVRS

Agricultural research institutes in the United Kingdom
Horticultural organisations based in the United Kingdom
Research institutes in Warwickshire
Science and technology in Lincolnshire
University of Warwick